Maracanã Esporte Clube, commonly known as Maracanã, is a Brazilian football club based in Maracanaú, Ceará state.

History
The club was founded on January 31, 2005 and joined the Federação Cearense de Futebol in the same year. Maracanã was promoted to the 2008 Campeonato Cearense Second Level after finishing in the second position in the 2007 Campeonato Cearense Third Level. The team was promoted to the 2013 Campeonato Cearense after they won the Campeonato Cearense Second Level in 2012, when they defeated Pacatuba 4–2 on May 27, 2012 in Horizonte, in the last round of the competition.

Honours
Campeonato Cearense Série B: 2012, 2021
Campeonato Cearense Série C: 2020
Campeonato Cearense de Futsal: 2012

Stadium
Maracanã Esporte Clube play their home games at Estádio Municipal Ribeirão. The stadium has a maximum capacity of 2,000 people.

Uniforms

The colors of the Maracanã uniform, the sky blue, and the white, being the 1st uniform, is the vertical striped shirt in sky blue and white, with blue shorts and white socks.

The second uniform consists of a white shirt with details in light blue, with white shorts and white stockings.

References

Association football clubs established in 2005
Football clubs in Ceará
2005 establishments in Brazil